The fathom is an English unit of measurement.
Fathom may also refer to:

Film and television
 Fathom (1967 film), a spy comedy film directed by Leslie H. Martinson, starring Anthony Franciosa and Raquel Welch
Fathom (2021 film), an American documentary film
 Fathom, a working title of the 2005–2006 science-fiction television series Surface
 Fathom Events, a distribution company that narrowcasts programming to cinemas via satellite

Literature
 Fathom (comics), an ongoing comic-book series since 1998, created by Michael Turner
 Fathom, a 2008 novel by Cherie Priest

Other uses
 The wa or Thai fathom, now metricized
 Fathom, 1983 video game by Imagic
 Fathom (album), 1993 album by Mortal
 Fathom Journal, published by Britain Israel Communications and Research Centre
 Fathom.com, a defunct online learning website developed by Columbia University
 fathom (cruise line), a cruise line established by Carnival Corporation & plc in June 2015
 Fathom: Dynamic Data Software, educational math software by Key Curriculum Press
 Fathom Records, a division of Hearts of Space Records